Nindu Hrudayalu is 1969 Telugu-language action drama film, produced by M. Jagannatha Rao under the S.V.S. Films banner and directed by K. Viswanath. It stars N. T. Rama Rao, Sobhan Babu, Vanisri and has music composed by T. V. Raju. This film was K. Viswanath's breakthrough work.

Plot
Veeraju (Satyanarayana) is a deadly gangster who creates fake currency along with his partners Prasad (Relangi) & Kamini (Mohana) with the help of an artist Sridhar (Tyagaraju). After the completion of their work, Veeraju brutally kills Sridhar, which was witnessed by his son Gopi (Master Rajkumar) who decides to take revenge against him. On the other side, Kamini poisons Prasad but takes his daughter Sarada along with her. Before leaving, Veeraju meets his wife Janaki (Rukmini) and son Chitti Babu (Master Krishnaji Nag). Here the police arrest Janaki on suspicion and Chitti Babu becomes alone. An orphan Maruthi (Master Visweswara Rao) takes care of him and changes his name to Ramu. Fortunately, Gopi also joins them and they all become one family. Years roll by, Gopi (N. T. Rama Rao), Ramu (Shobhan Babu) and Maruthi (Chalam) stay as tenants at Govindaiah's (Allu Ramalingaiah) house. Ramu loves his daughter Lalitha (Geetanjali), an arrogant woman and marries her. Gopi is still in search of Veeraju, who turned into Raja Shekaram, makes the public believe as a noble & kindhearted person. He showcases Kamini as his wife and Sarada (Vanisri) as the daughter. Sarada is a doctor, she gets acquainted with Gopi and they fall in love. After facing many problems, Janaki takes shelter of Gopi and shows motherly affection to 3 brothers without knowing that Ramu is her own. Once she sees Veeraju, but she drags behind, thinking that he has remarried Kamini. Meanwhile, Maruthi loves a girl Geetha (Chandrakala), daughter of a prostitute Anasuya (Chaya Devi). Raja Shekaram is behind Geetha and Gopi recognizes him as Veeraju by the tattoo on his hand while protecting Geetha. After that, Maruthi marries Geetha but Lalitha and her father did not accept and create disputes between the brothers which leads to the breakup of the family. Shockingly, Prasad is alive, but became mad and joins as a patient in Sarada's hospital. Sarada takes care of him with love & affection without. Gopi follows Veeraju like a shadow, when he is about to kill him, Janaki obstructs his way. At that point in time, she learns her husband is the murderer of Gopi's father and struck in between motherhood and husband's safety. She too recognizes Ramu as Chitti Babu even after knowing that Veeraju is his father, Ramu stands for piety. Simultaneously, Sarada also knows that Prasad is her father. At last, in the final battle, Janaki sacrifices her life while protecting Gopi and requests Gopi to leave her husband. Veeraju also feels out of contrition and surrenders himself to Police. Finally, the movie ends on a happy note with the reunion of 3 brothers.

Cast
N. T. Rama Rao as Gopi
Vanisri as  Sharada 
Shobhan Babu as Ramu / Chitti Babu 
Satyanarayana as Veeraju / Raja Shekaram
Allu Ramalingaiah as Govindaiah
Chalam as Maruti 
Relangi as Prasad 
Mikkilineni  as Police Constable Rangaiah 
Tyagaraju as Sridhar Rao 
Geethanjali as Lalitha 
Chandrakala as Geetha 
Rukmini as Janaki 
Chaya Devi as Anasuya 
Mohini as Kamini Devi

Soundtrack

Music composed by T. V. Raju.

References

External links

Indian drama films
1960s Telugu-language films
Films directed by K. Viswanath
Films scored by T. V. Raju
1969 drama films